This is a list of compositions by Stanisław Moniuszko.

Stage works

Operettas

Operas

Ballet 
 Monte Christo, after Alexandre Dumas (1866)
 Na kwaterunku (On the Billet) (1868)
 Figle szatana (Satan's Tricks aka Devil's Frolics) (1870)
 Merry Wives of Windsor (c. 1849), ballet music composed for the opera of Otto Nicolai

Theatre 
 Kasper Hauser (1843), melodrama by Auguste Anicet-Bourgeois and d'Ennery. First performance: Minsk, November 18, 1843
 Sabaudka (Savoyardess or the Mother's Blessing) melodrama in 5 acts by d'Ennery and Lemoine. First performance: Vilnius, May 6, 1845
 Hamlet. Shakespeare's tragedy. First performance: Warsaw, March 24, 1871
 Zbojcy (Die Rauber). Schiller's tragedy. First performance: Warsaw 1870 and 1871
 Hans Mathis, drama (1872). Finished by Adam Munchheimer
 Karpaccy gorale, drama by J. Korzeniowski

Vocal

Cantatas

Sacred

Masses and litanies

Minor works

Songs 
More than 300, listing the most popular:
 Chochlik (The Imp). Text by A.E. Odyniec
 Czaty (The Ambush), ballad. Text by A. Mickiewicz. Also in a version with orchestra
 Czarny krzyżyk (The Little Black Cross). Text by Bruno Bielawski.
 Dziad i baba (The Old Man and The Old Woman). Text by J.I. Kraszewski
 Dziadek i babka (Grandpa and Grandma). Text by P. Jankowski
 Entuzjasta (The Enthusiast). Text by J. Prusinowski
 Kozak (Cossack). Also known as Tam na gorze jawor stoi
 Kum i kuma (Chums). Text by J. Czeczot
 Łzy (Tears). Text by A.E. Odyniec
 Maciek. Text by T. Lenartowicz
 Magda karczmarka (Magda, the Innkeeper). Also known as W pustej karczmie Magda siedzi, ballad. Text by E. Sztyrmer
 Nad Nidą (On Nida River). Text by Włodzimierz Wolski
 Panicz i dziewczyna (The Young Master and The Girl). Also known as W gaiku zielonym. Text by A.E. Odyniec
 Pieśń wieczorna (The Song at Dusk). Also known as Po nocnej rosie. Text by W. Syrokomla
 Piosnka żołnierza (Soldier's Song). Also known as Już matka zasnęła. Text by J. Korzeniowski
 Polna różyczka (The Little, Field Rose). Text by J. Grajnert
 Powrót taty (Father's Return). Text by A. Mickiewicz
 Prząśniczka (The Spinner). Text by J. Czeczot. Also in a version with orchestra
 Rozmowa (Conversation). Also known as Kochanko moja, na co nam rozmowa. Text by A. Mickiewicz
 Rybka (The Fish). Text by A. Mickiewicz
 Świerszcz (The Cricket). Text by J.N. Kaminski
 Świtezianka (The Nymph of Lake Switez). Text by A. Mickiewicz
 Tren X (Lament No. X). Also known as Urszulo moja wdzieczna. Text by J. Kochanowski
 Trzech Budrysów (Three Budryses). Text by A. Mickiewicz. Also in a version with orchestra
 Trzy śpiewy: Niepewnosc, Pieszczotka, Sen (Three Chants: Uncertainty, Cuddlesome One, Dream). Text by A. Mickiewicz. German translation Blankensee
 Wilija (Christmas Eve). Text by A. Mickiewicz
 Znaszli ten kraj (Do You Know Such Land). Text by A. Mickiewicz, after J. W. Goethe

Instrumental

Chamber 
 String quartet no.1 in D minor (1839)
 String quartet no.2 in F major (before 1840)

Organ 
 Organ compositions on the themes of church songs, among others Vespers and Song of Ostra Brama. Published: Warsaw, 1862.

Piano 
 Fraszki (Trifles). Two books. Published: Vilnius, 1843
 Nocturne in A-flat major. Published: Vilnius, 1846
 Mazurka in D major. Published: Vilnius, before 1846
 Six Polonaises. Published: Vilnius, 1846
 Polka in C major. Published: Warsaw, 1851
 Polka, "Daniel". Published: Warsaw, 1852
 Polka, "Gabirela". Published: Warsaw, 1855
 "Spring" Polka. Published: Warsaw, 1860
 Vilanelle in B flat major. Published: Warsaw, 1851
 Three Waltzes. Published: Warsaw, 1852
 "Wedding" Mazurka. Published: Warsaw, 1872
 Kolysanka (Cradle Song) in D major. Published: Warsaw, 19 March 1872
 Piano transcriptions of opera fragments and of works by other composers, among others Six Polonaises of Michal Oginski. Published: Warsaw, before 1858
 Original compositions and transcriptions for piano duet

Symphonic 
 Bajka (Fairytale), fantastic overture (1848). Two versions. First performed: Vilnius, 1 May 1848
 Kain, overture (1856). First performance: St. Petersburg, March 1856
 War Overture. First performance: Vilnius, 19 March 1857
 Polonez koncertowy (concert polonaise) in A major, for large orchestra (1866)
 Polonez obywatelski, civic polonaise in F major (after 1863)

References

 
Moniuszko